AA560 is an orally active nonsteroidal antiandrogen (NSAA) that was developed in Japan and was first described in the literature in 1977 but was never marketed. It is an anilide derivative and analogue of the NSAA flutamide, and shows greater in vivo antiandrogenic potency than does flutamide. Similarly to flutamide, AA560 is a selective antagonist of the androgen receptor (AR) and consequently shows progonadotropic effects by increasing levels of gonadotropins and testosterone via disinhibition of the hypothalamic-pituitary-gonadal axis.

See also
 DIMP

References

Anilides
Nonsteroidal antiandrogens
Organochlorides